Squire Park is a neighborhood in the city of Seattle, in the U.S. state of Washington. According to the Squire Park Community Council, it is bounded on the south by S. Jackson Street, on the west by 12th Avenue and 12th Avenue S., on the north by E. Union Street, and on the east by 23rd Avenue and 23rd Avenue S., placing it within the Central District. Its main thoroughfares are E. Jefferson and Cherry Streets and E. Yesler Way (east- and west-bound) and 14th Avenue (north- and south-bound). Swedish Medical Center's Cherry Hill campus is located here, Seattle University, a Jesuit University has part of its campus in Squire Park, as the Admissions, some dormitories and Athletics departments are east of 12th Avenue.

Squire Park overlaps considerably with Cherry Hill, Seattle, although Squire Park boundaries are shifted slightly southwards, with the northern boundary at E. Union Street rather than E. Madison Street, and the southern boundary at S. Jackson Street rather than Yesler Way.

Squire Park is named after Watson Squire, who was a Washington territory governor, Washington state's first US Senator, and owner of much of the original neighborhood land in a parcel bounded by 12th and 20th Avenues and Cherry and Alder Streets. This parcel was platted by Squire in 1890 and acquired by the city of Seattle in 1891.

References